Harefield Road was a proposed London Underground station on the western branch of the Central line beyond its current terminus at West Ruislip.

Under the London Passenger Transport Board's 1935–1940 New Works programme, the station would have been built alongside the existing Great Western and Great Central Joint Railway (GW&GCJR) line between West Ruislip and Denham as the penultimate station on the Central line's extension from North Acton.

Like many other new stations built by London Underground in the outskirts of the capital, the construction of the station was intended to stimulate new housing developments in what was a rural part of Middlesex. Works on the extension were postponed during World War II and, after the war, green belt legislation was introduced to limit the expansion of urban areas. The area beyond West Ruislip fell within the designated Metropolitan Green Belt, and, as the intended housing developments were no longer allowed, the extension beyond West Ruislip was cancelled.

Earlier station 
The line through the station site was opened for goods services by the GW&GCJR on 20 November 1905 with passenger services beginning on 2 April 1906. and had previously been occupied by a short-lived station.

On 24 September 1928, the GW&GCJR opened a station as Harefield Halt. This was renamed South Harefield Halt in May 1929. A goods yard was served from 27 June 1929.

Notes and references

Notes

References

Bibliography

External links
A History of the London Tube Maps, Map from 1939 showing future extension of the Central line to Harefield Road and Denham

Proposed London Underground stations
History of the London Borough of Hillingdon
Unbuilt London Underground stations
Disused railway stations in the London Borough of Hillingdon